MKJS is the ICAO code for Sangster International Airport, Montego Bay, Jamaica.

MKJS may also refer to:

Monster Kingdom: Jewel Summoner, a PlayStation Portable video game